Bebearia oremansi is a butterfly in the family Nymphalidae. It is found in Gabon and Equatorial Guinea.

References

Butterflies described in 1994
oremansi